Louise Whitfield Carnegie (March 7, 1857 – June 24, 1946) was the wife of philanthropist Andrew Carnegie.

Biography

Early life
Louise Whitfield was born on March 7, 1857, in the Chelsea neighborhood of Manhattan, New York City. Her parents—John D. Whitfield (died 1878), a prosperous New York City textile merchant, and Fannie Davis—descended from families who emigrated from England in the 1600s.

Reaching relative success, John moved the family from Chelsea to Gramercy Park and finally to a brownstone on West 48th Street and Fifth Avenue.

Adult life
At the age of 23, Whitfield met Andrew Carnegie, himself aged 45, through her father.

On April 22, 1887, Whitfield (now 30) married Carnegie (51) at her family's home in New York City in a private ceremony officiated by a pastor from the Church of the Divine Paternity, a Universalist church to which the Whitfields belonged. As wedding gifts from her husband, Louise received a home (formerly owned by Collis Potter Huntington) at 5 West 51st Street and an annual income of approximately $20,000. Louise signed a prenuptial agreement, renouncing any claims to Andrew’s fortune.

Ten years later, in 1897, Louise gave birth to the couple's only child, Margaret Carnegie. Louise and her daughter were members of the Brick Presbyterian Church and later the Church of the Divine Paternity (now the Fourth Universalist Society in the City of New York) for whom she and her husband funded their organ.

Carnegie died at the age of 89 in Manhattan on June 24, 1946. She was buried in Sleepy Hollow Cemetery, in Sleepy Hollow, New York.

Philanthropy
Louise was an influential member of the board of The Carnegie Corporation until her death. She advised Andrew Carnegie as they jointly helped the creation of over 2,500 libraries between 1883 and 1929.

After Andrew's death in 1919, Louise continued making charitable contributions to organizations including American Red Cross, the Y.W.C.A., the Cathedral of St. John the Divine, numerous World War II relief funds, and $100,000 to the Union Theological Seminary. She spent her summers at Skibo Castle.

References

Bibliography
Hendrick, Burton Jesse, and Daniel Henderson. 1950. Louise Whitfield Carnegie; The Life of Mrs. Andrew Carnegie. New York: Hastings House.
Krass, Peter. 2002. Carnegie. New Jersey: John Wiley & Sons.
Nasaw, David. 2006. Andrew Carnegie. New York: Penguin Press.
"Mr. Carnegie's Wedding" The New York Times, April 23, 1887.
"Mrs. Carnegie Dies; Steel Man's Widow", The New York Times, June 25, 1946.
"Rites in Home for Mrs. Carnegie", The New York Times, June 28, 1946.

1857 births
1946 deaths
Philanthropists from New York (state)
People from Gramercy Park
Burials at Sleepy Hollow Cemetery
Carnegie family
People from Chelsea, Manhattan
American people of English descent
American Universalists
Presbyterians from New York (state)